Gaudenzio Poli (1609–1679) was a Roman Catholic prelate who served as Bishop of Amelia (1643–1679).

Biography
Gaudenzio Poli was born in 1609 in Castello Scheggino, Italy and ordained a deacon in Jan 1643.
On 23 Feb 1643, he was appointed during the papacy of Pope Urban VIII as Bishop of Amelia.
On 8 Mar 1643, he was consecrated bishop by Faustus Poli, Titular Archbishop of Amasea, with Giovanni Battista Altieri (seniore), Bishop Emeritus of Camerino, and Lelio Falconieri, Titular Archbishop of Thebae, serving as co-consecrators. 
He served as Bishop of Amelia until his death on 28 May 1679.

While bishop, he was the principal co-consecrator of Rodolpho Acquaviva, Titular Bishop of Laodicea in Phrygia and Apostolic Nuncio to Switzerland (1668).

References

External links and additional sources
 (for Chronology of Bishops) 
 (for Chronology of Bishops) 

17th-century Italian Roman Catholic bishops
Bishops appointed by Pope Urban VIII
1609 births
1679 deaths